Alys Margaret Thomas (born 10 October 1990) is a British professional swimmer. She gained a gold medal and the 200m Butterfly Commonwealth games record in 2018.

Life
She was born in 1990 and she went to Lady Eleanor Holles School in Hampton, London.

She competed in the women's 100 metre butterfly event at the 2017 World Aquatics Championships. She won the women's 200 metres butterfly title at the Commonwealth Games in 2018, setting a new games record.  She also won two bronze medals at the 2018 European Championships.

In April 2021, Thomas was named as a member of the British team to go to the postponed 2020 Olympics.

References

External links
 
 

1990 births
Living people
British female swimmers
Welsh female swimmers
Female butterfly swimmers
Place of birth missing (living people)
Commonwealth Games medallists in swimming
Commonwealth Games gold medallists for Wales
Commonwealth Games bronze medallists for Wales
Swimmers at the 2018 Commonwealth Games
European Aquatics Championships medalists in swimming
Swimmers at the 2020 Summer Olympics
Olympic swimmers of Great Britain
Swimmers at the 2022 Commonwealth Games
Commonwealth Games competitors for Wales
21st-century British women
Medallists at the 2018 Commonwealth Games